"Run to the Water" is a song by alternative rock group Live, released on January 11, 2000, as the second single from their fifth studio album, The Distance to Here (1999). It became a moderate hit in early 2000, reaching the top 40 in Australia, Finland, and the Netherlands as well as on the American and Canadian rock charts. In Iceland, the song topped the chart for three weeks, becoming Live's second consecutive number-one single.

Chart performance 
The song was not released as a single in the United States but reached at number 14 on the Billboard Modern Rock Tracks chart and number 17 on the Billboard Mainstream Rock Tracks chart. In Canada, "Run to the Water" reached number 10 on the RPM Top 30 Rock Report. The single also charted at number 15 in Finland, number 25 in the Netherlands, number 34 in Australia, and number 44 in New Zealand. It peaked at number one in Iceland for three weeks, from April 28 to May 12, 2000, and became the band's second consecutive number-one single.

Music video 
The official music video for the song was directed by Martin Weisz. In the video, Ed Kowalczyk sings the song in a dilapidated bathroom, while the people in the street below, including the other band members, are harassed by the police. Kowalczk descends to the street where he and the other band members stand facing the riot police. Conflict seems inevitable until it begins to rain and the tension is released. Soon after, a bomb, thrown by the police, explodes and the water turns to fire, into which the band members jump. Kowalczyk wakes with a start to discover that he has been dreaming and smiles ecstatically as he washes his face in the sink.

There's also a second version of that video where, at the end, Kowalczyk comes out a pond on another plane of dimension, giving the story her full meaning.

Track listings 

European CD single
 "Run to the Water" – 4:27
 "The Dolphin's Cry" (acoustic) – 5:09

European maxi-CD single
 "Run to the Water" (album version) – 4:27
 "The Dolphin's Cry" (acoustic version) – 5:09
 "I Alone" (recorded live for Y100) – 5:06
 "The Dolphin's Cry" (radio mix) – 4:01

Australian CD single
 "Run to the Water" (album version)
 "The Dolphin's Cry" (acoustic version)
 "I Alone" (recorded live for Y100)
 "The Dolphin's Cry" (radio mix)
 "Turn My Head" (recorded live in Melbourne, Australia, May 1997)
 This single was included as a bonus disc on the Australian release of The Distance to Here.

Credits and personnel 
Credits are lifted from the US promo CD liner notes and The Distance to Here album booklet.

Studios
 Recorded at The Site (San Rafael, California), Village Recorder (West Los Angeles), A&M Studios (Hollywood, California), and The Plant (Sausalito, California)
 Mixed at South Beach Studios (Miami Beach, Florida) and Encore Studios (Burbank, California)
 Mastered at Sterling Sound (New York City)

Live
 Ed Kowalczyk – lyrics, vocals, guitar
 Patrick Dahlheimer – lyrics, music, bass
 Chad Taylor – lead guitars
 Chad Gracey – drums
 Live – production

Other personnel

 Jerry Harrison – production
 Gary Kurfirst – executive production
 Tom Lord-Alge – mixing
 Karl Derfler – engineering
 Doug McKean – additional engineering
 Ted Jensen – mastering
 David Sestak – management
 Peter Freedman – management

Charts

Weekly charts

Year-end charts

Release history

References 

1999 songs
2000 singles
Live (band) songs
Music videos directed by Martin Weisz
Number-one singles in Iceland
Radioactive Records singles
Song recordings produced by Jerry Harrison
Songs written by Ed Kowalczyk
Songs written by Patrick Dahlheimer
Universal Music Australia singles